Entisar al-Hammadi (born 25 January 2001) is a Yemeni actress and model.

Personal life 
Entisar was born on 25 January 2001, Taiz Governorate, to a Yemeni father and an Ethiopian mother. She moved moved to Sana'a with her family. She grew up with an ambition to become a model despite growing up in a conservative society. In 2017 she began her career as a model and appeared in print and online advertisements for cosmetic and haircare local companies. In 2020 she began acting on television and appeared for the first time in two local TV drama series "Sad al-Gharib" and Ghurbat al-Bun".

Her detention 
On 20 February 2021 Entisar was detained by the Houthi  in Sana'a and sentenced by a Houthi-run court to five years in prison eight months later. The Houthis accused her of "prostitution and drug abuse." She and her lawyers denied these charges. The HRW group said the Houthis carried out an unfair trial of Entisar and her case marred with irregularities and abuse. In July 2021 she was transferred to the hospital as she attempted suicide inside her jail.

Reference 

Living people
2001 births
People from Taiz Governorate
Yemeni female models
Yemeni actresses